Penstemon pachyphyllus is a species of flowering plant in the plantain family known by the common name thickleaf beardtongue. It is native to the western United States, particularly the Great Basin.

This species is a perennial herb growing up to 65 centimeters tall. The leaves are fleshy and smooth-edged. The flowers are blue to shades of purple. The staminode is very hairy.

References

External links

pachyphyllus
Flora of the Western United States